Osnaburg Local School District (East Canton local schools) is a school district located in Stark County, Ohio, United States. It has around 880 students in Pre-K-12. There mascot is the hornets, and their colors are blue and gold

The distract has one building housing all Pre-K-12 students though they are split up between elementary, middle and high school.

East Canton high school is the districts only high school.

School districts in Stark County, Ohio
School districts in Ohio